St Michael and All Angels’ Church, Hathersage, is a Grade I listed parish church in the Church of England in Hathersage, Derbyshire.

History

The church dates from the 14th century. It was restored between 1851 and 1852 by William Butterfield and reopened on 15 April 1852. The whitewash on the walls was removed and the outer pillars and buttresses were renewed. The church was re-pewed with open seats. A new stained-glass window by William Wailes of Newcastle was inserted at the east end of the chancel. There is a stained-glass window by Charles Kempe, which was removed from Derwent Chapel before it was submerged under the Ladybower Reservoir. The church was tiled with Minton encaustic tiles. The total cost of the restoration was £1,575.

There were some further extensions added in 1949.

Tomb of Little John

This would have made Little John  in height.

Parish status

The church is in a joint parish with St John the Baptist's Church, Bamford and Derwent.

Memorials
Robert Eyre (d. 1459) and his wife Joan
Radulph Eyre (d. 1493) and his wife Elizabeth
Sir Arthur Eyre (d. 1560)

Organ

The church contains a pipe organ by James Jepson Binns which was formerly in Wadsley Bridge Methodist Church, Sheffield, and was moved here in 1981 by Gilbert Sellers. A specification of the organ can be found on the National Pipe Organ Register.

Bells

The tower contains a ring of six bells with the oldest dating from ca. 1520. In addition there is a sanctus bell dating from ca. 1499.

See also
Grade I listed churches in Derbyshire
Grade I listed buildings in Derbyshire
Listed buildings in Hathersage

References

Church of England church buildings in Derbyshire
Grade I listed churches in Derbyshire